Jevon Tarantino (born January 30, 1984) is an American springboard diver. He is a member of the Fort Lauderdale Diving Team and is coached by David Burgering. He was a member of the US National Team for seven years(2001–2008). He represented the United States at the 2008 Olympic Games. He is a five-time Junior National Champion, a four-time Senior National Champion, the 2004 SEC Champion (University of Tennessee), the 2004 NCAA Champion (University of Tennessee), and a member of the 2005 and 2006 World Championship teams.

References 
 Jevon Tarantino at the United States Olympic Committee
 

Divers at the 2008 Summer Olympics
Olympic divers of the United States
1984 births
Living people
Sportspeople from Boynton Beach, Florida
Tennessee Volunteers men's divers